The International Trade Administration (ITA) is an agency in the United States Department of Commerce that promotes United States exports of nonagricultural U.S. services and goods.

Duties
The ITA's stated goals are to
 Provide practical information to help Americans select markets and products.
 Ensure that Americans have access to international markets as required by the U.S. trade agreements.
 Safeguard Americans from unfair competition from dumped and subsidized imports.

Organization

ITA consists of three sub-units.  These are: Industry and Analysis (I&A), Global Markets (GM), and Enforcement and Compliance (E&C).

Under Secretary of Commerce for International Trade
Deputy Under Secretary of Commerce for International Trade
Assistant Secretary of Commerce for Global Markets and Director General of the U.S. Commercial Service
Office of Strategic Planning
Deputy Director General of the U.S. Commercial Service
Office of Foreign Service and Human Capital
Office of Budget
Business Information Technology Office
Office of Administrative Services
Deputy Assistant Secretary for Global Markets
Global Knowledge Center
SelectUSA
Office of Domestic Operations
Office of China
Office of Europe, the Middle East, and Africa
Office of Asia
Office of the Western Hemisphere
Advocacy Center
Assistant Secretary of Commerce for Industry and Analysis
Office of Manufacturing
Office of Transportation and Machinery
Office of Energy and Environment
Office of Health & Information Technology
Office of Services
Office of Finance & Insurance Industries
Office of Digital Services Industries
Office of Supply Chain, Professional, & Business Services
Office of Trade Policy and Analysis
Office of Trade & Economic Analysis
Office of Trade Negotiations & Analysis
Office of Standards & Investment Policy
Office of Intellectual Property Rights
Office of Textiles, Consumer Goods, and Materials
Office of Consumer Goods
Office of Textiles & Apparel
Office of Materials Industries
National Travel and Tourism Office
Office of Travel and Tourism Industries
Office of Advisory Committees and Industry Outreach
Office of Trade Programs and Strategic Partnerships
Office of Planning, Coordination, and Management
Trade Agreement Secretariat
Assistant Secretary of Commerce for Enforcement and Compliance
Office of Anti-Dumping and Countervailing Duties Operations
Office of Policy and Negotiations

The U.S. Commercial Service, through its Strategic Corporate Partnership program, has Public Private Partnership agreements with 17  private organizations, including several banks, legal and regulatory organizations, transportation and shipping organizations, event organizers, trade risk service companies and the publisher of Commercial News USA, the official export promotion magazine of the U.S. Department of Commerce, The ecommerce partner is the Federation of International Trade Associations under which the USCS contributes market research and other reports on GlobalTrade.net.

Leadership

The ITA was created on January 2, 1980 and is headed by the Under Secretary of Commerce for International Trade (USC(IT)), the principal adviser to the Secretary of Commerce on American imports and exports. The Under Secretary is the head of the International Trade Administration within the Commerce Department.

The Under Secretary is appointed by the President of the United States with the consent of the United States Senate. The last presidential appointee was Gilbert B. Kaplan, who was nominated by President Trump for the position of Under Secretary for International Trade on April 11, 2017, and confirmed by the Senate on March 13, 2018. Gilbert Kaplan left the position in late 2019. Joseph C. Semsar is currently Acting Under Secretary.

Overview
The Under Secretary of Commerce for International Trade is the principal officer of the United States Department of Commerce charged with promoting American exports and assisting general international trade. As the Administrator of the International Trade Administration, the Under Secretary also sits on the board of directors of the Overseas Private Investment Corporation, and serves as a member of the Tourism Policy Council and the National Intellectual Property Council. The Under Secretary participates in the development of United States trade policy, identifies and resolves market access and compliance issues, administers American trade laws, and undertakes a range of trade promotion and trade advocacy efforts.

With the rank of Under Secretary, the USC(IT) is a Level III position within the Executive Schedule. Since January 2014, the annual rate of pay for Level III appointees is $167,000.

Reporting officials
Officials reporting to the USC(IT) include:
Deputy Under Secretary of Commerce for International Trade
Assistant Secretary of Commerce for Global Markets and Director General of the U.S. & Foreign Commercial Service
Assistant Secretary of Commerce for Enforcement and Compliance
Assistant Secretary of Commerce for Industry and Analysis

List of Under Secretaries

See also
 Agreement on Trade-Related Aspects of Intellectual Property Rights
 Bureau of Industry and Security
 Doha Round
 Generalized System of Preferences
 Title 15 of the Code of Federal Regulations
 Title 19 of the Code of Federal Regulations
 International Trade Commission
 Office of the United States Trade Representative
 United States Commercial Service
 United States Trade Representative
 World Trade Organization

References

External links 
International Trade Administration website 
 International Trade Administration in the Federal Register
 Records of the Office of Export Supply 1949-1959
 Records of the Export Control Investigations Staff 1948-1962

Anti-dumping authorities
Government agencies established in 1980
United States Department of Commerce agencies
United States trade policy
1980 establishments in Washington, D.C.